Amphicnephes is a genus of signal flies in the family Platystomatidae. There are at least three described species in Amphicnephes.

Species
These three species belong to the genus Amphicnephes:
Amphicnephes fasciola Coquillett, 1900
Amphicnephes pullus (Wiedemann, 1830)
Amphicnephes stellatus Wulp, 1899 c g
Data sources: c = Catalogue of Life, g = GBIF,

References

Further reading

 

Platystomatidae
Articles created by Qbugbot
Schizophora genera